Circus Galop is a piece written for player pianos by Marc-André Hamelin. It was composed between the years 1991 and 1994 and it is dedicated to Beatrix and Jürgen Hocker, piano roll makers. Its duration is approximately 4–5 minutes. Scores of this piece are available through the Sorabji Archive. Piano rolls of this piece are available from Wolfgang Heisig and Jürgen Hocker, who have recorded all three of Hamelin's player piano pieces on the MDG label, which were released in April 2008.

This piece is sometimes considered a precursor to Black MIDI, due to its impossibility and complexity. Circus Galop oftentimes has upwards of 15 notes played at the same time, which is way too many for one person to play on a piano. There have been performances of the piece on YouTube using one piano but multiple players responsible for different areas of the piano, creating an apparently seamless performance of the piece.

References

External links
Circus Galop Hamelin in Stockholm
Circus Galop being played automatically by a restored player piano.

Compositions by Marc-André Hamelin
Compositions for two pianos
1994 compositions
Galops